Maryland and Louisiana Tech played to the only tie in Independence Bowl history as the Terrapins used a 14-6 fourth-quarter scoring advantage to tie. Tech running back Michael Richardson rushed for 81 yards and two touchdowns to earn offensive outstanding player honors. Louisiana Tech linebacker Lorenza Baker of Haughton earned outstanding defensive player honors.

Invitation
Baylor University, then a member of the Southwest Conference, was extended an invitation to play in the 1990 Poulan Weed-Eater Independence Bowl before the last game of the season versus Texas. Coach Grant Teaff declined the invitation because the Bears still had an outside chance at the conference championship and an appearance in the Cotton Bowl.  The Bears lost to Texas and did not play in a bowl game that season, despite finishing 6-4-1.

Game summary

Scoring summary

Statistics

References

Independence Bowl
Independence Bowl
Louisiana Tech Bulldogs football bowl games
Maryland Terrapins football bowl games
December 1990 sports events in the United States
1990 in sports in Louisiana